Asfejan (also Romanized as Asfejān; also known as Asfenjān, Asfenjan, and Asfijān) is a village in Kuhestan Rural District, in the Central District of Nain County, Isfahan Province, Iran. At the 2006 census, its population was 14, in 6 families.

References 

Populated places in Nain County